The National Conference of Black Lawyers (NCBL) is an American association, formed in 1968, to offer legal assistance to black civil rights activists, it is made up of judges, law students, lawyers, legal activists, legal workers, and scholars.

Noted clients included Angela Davis, Assata Shakur, the Attica Brothers, Geronimo Pratt, Mumia Abu-Jamal, the Ben Chavis and the Wilmington Ten. The organization lobbied against apartheid in South Africa.

They expanded from African-American oppression to help other groups in countries like: Northern Ireland, the Palestinian territories, Cuba, Nicaragua, Guyana, Grenada, and throughout Southern Africa.

The group's mission is: "To protect human rights, to achieve self-determination of Africa and African Communities and to work in coalition to assist in ending oppression of all peoples."

References

External links
 

African-American professional organizations
Civil liberties advocacy groups in the United States
1968 establishments in the United States
Civil rights organizations in the United States
Legal advocacy organizations in the United States
Organizations based in Michigan
Organizations established in 1968